NASA's Solar Terrestrial Probes program (STP) is a series of missions focused on study the Sun-Earth system. It is part of NASA's  Heliophysics Science Division within the Science Mission Directorate.

Objectives
Understand the fundamental physical processes of the complex space environment throughout the Solar System, which includes the flow of energy and charged material, known as plasma, as well as a dynamic system of magnetic and electric fields.
Understand how human society, technological systems, and the habitability of planets are affected by solar variability and planetary magnetic fields.
Develop the capability to predict the extreme and dynamic conditions in space in order to maximize the safety and productivity of human and robotic explorers.

Missions

TIMED

The TIMED (Thermosphere Ionosphere Mesosphere Energetics and Dynamics) is an orbiter mission dedicated to study the dynamics of the Mesosphere and Lower Thermosphere (MLT) portion of the Earth's atmosphere. The mission was launched from Vandenberg Air Force Base in California on December 7, 2001 aboard a Delta II rocket launch vehicle.

Hinode

Hinode, an ongoing collaboration with JAXA, is a mission to explore the magnetic fields of the Sun. It was launched on the final flight of the M-V-7 rocket from Uchinoura Space Center, Japan on September 22, 2006.

STEREO

STEREO (Solar Terrestrial Relations Observatory) is a solar observation mission. It consists in two nearly identical spacecraft, launched on October 26, 2006.

MMS

The Magnetospheric Multiscale Mission (MMS) is a mission to study the Earth's magnetosphere, using four identical spacecraft flying in a tetrahedral formation. The spacecraft were launched on March 13, 2015.

IMAP

IMAP (Interstellar Mapping and Acceleration Probe) is a heliosphere observation mission. Planned for launch in 2025, it will sample, analyze, and map particles streaming to Earth from the edges of interstellar space.

References

External links
NASA Goddard Space Flight Center - Solar Terrestrial Probes Program
NASA Science Mission Directorate - Solar Terrestrial Probes Program

NASA programs
Plasma physics
Space plasmas
Space science experiments